Gladius is a Latin word meaning "sword" (of any type), but in its narrow sense it refers to the sword of ancient Roman foot soldiers. Early ancient Roman swords were similar to those of the Greeks, called xiphe (plural; singular xiphos). From the 3rd century BC, however, the soldiers of the Roman Republic adopted a sword based on the celtic sword used by the Celtiberians in Hispania late into the Punic Wars, known in Latin as the gladius hispaniensis, meaning "Hispanic-type sword". New variants of the gladius, such as the "Mainz gladius" and the "Pompeii gladius", were used from the first century AD and during the early centuries of the Roman Empire; in the third century AD the Roman infantry replaced the gladius with the "spatha" (which was already used by Roman cavalrymen).

A fully equipped Roman legionary after the reforms of Gaius Marius was armed with a shield (scutum), one or two javelins (pila), a sword (gladius), often a dagger (pugio), and, perhaps in the later empire period, darts (plumbatae). A soldier generally led with the shield and thrust with the sword.

Etymology
Gladius is a Latin masculine noun. However,  in Latin refers to any sword, not only the sword described here. The word appears in literature as early as the plays of Plautus (Casina, Rudens).

Gladius is generally believed to be a Celtic loan in Latin (perhaps via an Etruscan intermediary), derived from ancient Celtic  or  "sword" (whence modern Welsh  "sword", modern Breton , Old Irish /Modern Irish  [itself perhaps a loan from Welsh]; the root  of the word may survive in the Old Irish verb claidid "digs, excavates" and anciently attested in the Gallo-Brittonic place name element cladia/clado "ditch, trench, valley hollow").

Modern English words derived from  include gladiator ("swordsman") and gladiolus ("little sword", from the diminutive form of gladius), a flowering plant with sword-shaped leaves.

Predecessors and origins

According to Polybius, the sword used by the Roman army during the Battle of Telamon in 225 BC, though deemed superior to the cumbersome Gallic swords, was mainly useful to thrust. These thrusting swords used before the adoption of the Gladius were possibly based on the Greek xiphos. Later, during the Battle of Cannae in 216 BC, they found Hannibal's Celtiberian mercenaries wielding swords that excelled at both slashing and thrusting. A text attributed to Polybius describes the adoption of this design by the Romans even before the end of the war, which canonical Polybius reaffirms by calling the later Roman sword gladius hispaniensis in Latin and iberiké machaira in Greek. It is believed Scipio Africanus was the promoter of the change after the Battle of Cartagena in 209 BC, after which he set the inhabitants to produce weapons for the Roman army.

In 70 BC, both Claudius Quadrigarius and Livy relate the story of Titus Manlius Torquatus using a "Hispanic sword" (gladius Hispanus) in a duel with a Gaul in 361 BC. However, this has been traditionally considered a terminological anachronism caused by the long established naming convention. Still, some believe the Celtiberian sword was adopted after encounters with Carthaginian mercenaries of that nationality during the First Punic War (264-241 BC), not the second. In any case, the gladius hispaniensis became particularly known in 200 BC during the Second Macedonian War, in which Macedonian soldiers became horrified at what Roman swords could do after an early cavalry skirmish. It has been suggested that the sword used by Roman cavalrymen was different from the infantry model, but most academics have discarded this view.

Arguments for the Celtiberian source of the weapon have been reinforced in recent decades by discovery of early Roman gladii that seem to highlight that they were copies of Celtiberian models. The weapon developed in Iberia after La Tène I models, which were adapted to traditional Celtiberian techniques during the late 4th and early 3rd centuries BC. These weapons are quite original in their design, so that they cannot be confused with Gallic types. As for the origin of the word gladius, one theory proposes the borrowing of the word from *kladi- during the Gallic wars, relying on the principle that K often became G in Latin. Ennius attests the word gladius may have replaced ensis, which until then was used mainly by poets.

Manufacture

By the time of the Roman Republic, which flourished during the Iron Age, steel and the steel-making process was known to the classical world. Pure iron is relatively soft, but pure iron is never found in nature. Natural iron ore contains various impurities in solid solution, which harden the reduced metal by producing irregular-shaped metallic crystals. The gladius was generally made out of steel.

In Roman times, workers reduced ore in a bloomery furnace. The resulting pieces were called blooms, which they further worked to remove slag inclusions from the porous surface.

A recent metallurgical study of two Etrurian swords, one in the form of a Greek kopis from 7th century BC Vetulonia, the other in the form of a gladius Hispaniensis from 4th century BC Clusium (Chiusi), gives insight concerning the manufacture of Roman swords. The Chiusi sword comes from Romanized etruria; thus, regardless of the names of the forms (which the authors do not identify), the authors believe the process was continuous from the Etruscans to the Romans.

The Vetulonian sword was crafted by the pattern welding process from five blooms reduced at a temperature of 1163 °C. Five strips of varying carbon content were created. A central core of the sword contained the highest: 0.15–0.25% carbon. On its edges were placed four strips of low-carbon steel, 0.05–0.07%, and the whole thing was welded together by forging on the pattern of hammer blows. A blow increased the temperature sufficiently to produce a friction weld at that spot. Forging continued until the steel was cold, producing some central annealing.

The Chiusian sword was created from a single bloom by forging from a temperature of 1237 °C. The carbon content increased from 0.05–0.08% at the back side of the sword to 0.35–0.4% on the blade, from which the authors deduce that some form of carburization may have been used.

Romans continued to forge swords, both as composites and from single pieces. Inclusions of sand and rust weakened the two swords in the study, and no doubt limited the strength of swords during the Roman period.

Description
The word gladius acquired a general meaning as any type of sword. This use appears as early as the 1st century AD in the Biography of Alexander the Great by Quintus Curtius Rufus. The republican authors, however, appear to mean a specific type of sword, which is now known from archaeology to have had variants.

Gladii were two-edged for cutting and had a tapered point for stabbing during thrusting. A solid grip was provided by a knobbed hilt added on, possibly with ridges for the fingers. Blade strength was achieved by welding together strips, in which case the sword had a channel down the center, or by fashioning a single piece of high-carbon steel, rhomboidal in cross-section. The owner's name was often engraved or punched on the blade.

The hilt of a Roman sword was the capulus. It was often ornate, especially the sword-hilts of officers and dignitaries.

Stabbing was a very efficient technique, as stabbing wounds, especially in the abdominal area, were almost always deadly. However, the gladius in some circumstances was used for cutting or slashing, as is indicated by Livy's account of the Macedonian Wars, wherein the Macedonian soldiers were horrified to see dismembered bodies.

Though the primary infantry attack was thrusting at stomach height, they were trained to take any advantage, such as slashing at kneecaps beneath the shield wall.

The gladius was sheathed in a scabbard mounted on a belt or shoulder strap. Some say the soldier reached across his body to draw it, and others claim that the position of the shield made this method of drawing impossible. A centurion wore it on the opposite side as a mark of distinction.

Towards the end of the 2nd century AD and during the 3rd century the spatha gradually took the place of the gladius in the Roman legions.

Types
Several different designs were used; among collectors and historical reenactors, the three primary kinds are known as the Mainz gladius, the Fulham gladius, and the Pompeii gladius (these names refer to where or how the canonical example was found). More recent archaeological finds have uncovered an earlier version, the gladius Hispaniensis.

The differences between these varieties are subtle. The original Hispanic sword, which was used during the republic, had a slight "wasp-waist" or "leaf-blade" curvature. The Mainz variety came into use on the frontier in the early empire. It kept the curvature, but shortened and widened the blade and made the point triangular. At home, the less battle-effective Pompeii version came into use. It eliminated the curvature, lengthened the blade, and diminished the point. The Fulham was a compromise, with straight edges and a long point.

Gladius Hispaniensis 
The Gladius Hispaniensis  was a Roman sword used from around 216 BC until 20 BC. This gladius was also the earliest and longest blade. It had a pronounced leaf-shape.

Mainz Gladius 

The Mainz Gladius  is made of heavily corroded iron and a sheath made of tinned and gilded bronze. The point of the sword was more triangular than the Gladius Hispaniensis. The Mainz Gladius still had wasp-waisted curves. The decoration on the scabbard illustrates the ceding of military victory to Augustus by Tiberius after a successful Alpine campaign. Augustus is semi-nude, and sits in the pose of Jupiter, flanked by the Roman gods of Victory and Mars Ultor, while Tiberius, in military dress, presents Augustus with a statuette of Victory.

Fulham Gladius 
The Fulham gladius or Mainz-Fulham gladius was a Roman sword that  was used after Aulus Plautius'  invasion of Britain in 43 AD. The Romans used it until the end of the 1st century. The Fulham gladius has a triangular tip. The swords weighs  (wooden hilt). A full size replica can be seen at Fulham Palace, Fulham.

Pompeii gladius 

The Pompeii gladius was named by modern historians after the Roman town of Pompeii. This type of gladius was by far the most popular one. Four instances of the sword type were found in Pompeii, with others turning up elsewhere. The sword has parallel cutting edges and a triangular tip. This is the shortest of the gladii. It is often confused with the spatha, which was a longer, slashing weapon used initially by mounted auxilians. Over the years, the Pompeii got longer, and these later versions are called semi-spathes. The sword weighs  (wooden hilt).

Popular culture
 Gladiator features a gladius sword used by Maximus.
 Power Rangers Wild Force features the Blue Ranger Max Cooper wielding the Sword of Pardolis, a gladius-themed weapon with a similarity to his Giraffe Zord.

See also

 Iron Age sword
 Model 1816 French artillery short sword
 Model 1832 foot artillery sword1
 Qama
 Roman military personal equipment

Notes

This is only true for the nominative case; For more information, see the Latin declension page.

References
 Significant Contributions in the Study of European Arms and Armor, bibliography by the Arms and Armor Society of America.
 Armamentarium: subject bibliographies: swords
 John William Humphrey, John Peter Oleson, Andrew Neil Sherwood, Greek and Roman Technology: a sourcebook

External links

The articles in the links below often differ both in theory and in detail. They should not necessarily be understood as fully professional articles but should be appreciated for their presentational value.

Pictures of ancient swords
 Roman Military Equipment at the Roman Numismatic Gallery (romancoins.info)

Reenactments, reconstructions, experimental archaeology
 Legio IX Hispana: photos of historical reconstructionists drawing and holding gladii.

Articles on the history or manufacture of the sword
 Ross Cowan, Gladius Gallicus, an introduction to the Gallic-type swords used by the Romans prior to the adoption of the gladius Hispaniensis
 Iron of the Empire: The History and Development of the Roman Gladius (myArmoury.com article)
 Janet Lang, Study of the Metallography of Some Roman Swords
 Niko Silvester, From Rapier to Langsax: Sword Structure in the British Isles in the Bronze and Iron Ages
 Richard F. Burton, The Sword Amongst the Barbarians (Early Roman Empire).
Taylor, Michael J. "Panoply and Identity during the Roman Republic." Papers of the British School at Rome 88 (2020), 31-65. 

Ancient Roman legionary equipment
Blade weapons
Roman swords